Burkburnett High School is a public high school located in the city of Burkburnett, Texas, United States, and classified as a 4A school by the UIL.  It is a part of the Burkburnett Independent School District located in northern Wichita County.   In 2015, the school was rated "met standard" by the Texas Education Agency.

Academics
Current issues and events champions - 
1991(4A)

Athletics
The Burkburnett Bulldogs compete in:

 Baseball
 Basketball
 Cheerleading
 Cross country
 Football
 Golf
 Powerlifting
 Soccer
 Softball
 Tennis
 Track
 Volleyball

The Burkburnett athletic director and head boys basketball coach, Danny Nix, won his 500th game in February 2019.

State finalist

Boys Basketball - 
2008(3A), 2011(3A)

Air Force JROTC 
Burkburnett High School has an Air Force Junior Reserve Officer's Training Corps unit, established in 2000. Its unit code is TX-20008. It has a drill team (armed and unarmed), color guard, sabre team (Swords), and a physical training team. Cadets who serve 2 years in the program get a rank of E-2 in the U.S. military if they choose to enlist. If a cadet does 3 or more years, then they be ranked E-3 when they enlist in either the U.S. Air Force or the U.S. Navy.

References

External links
Burkburnett ISD

Schools in Wichita County, Texas
Public high schools in Texas